Otto Eduard Weddigen (15 September 1882 – 18 March 1915) was an Imperial German Navy U-boat commander during World War I. He was awarded the Pour le Mérite, Germany's highest honour, for sinking four British warships.

Biography and career 

He was born in Herford, in the Prussian Province of Westphalia and started his military career in the Kaiserliche Marine in 1901. In 1910 he was given command of one of the first German submarines, .

In the action of 22 September 1914, while patrolling in the region of the southern North Sea known to the British as the "Broad Fourteens", U-9 intercepted the three warships of the Seventh Cruiser Squadron. Weddigen fired off all six of his torpedoes, reloaded while submerged, and in less than an hour sank the three British armoured cruisers HMS Aboukir, HMS Hogue and HMS Cressy. Sixty two officers and 1,397 other men were killed, leaving 837 survivors. Weddigen was awarded the Iron Cross, second and first class for this action.

After sinking HMS Hawke and some merchant ships, Weddigen received Prussia's highest military order, the Pour le Mérite.
He also received the highest military honours of the other kingdoms of the German Empire: The Knight's Cross of the Military Order of Max Joseph of the Bavaria (making him one of only six non-Bavarians to receive this), the Knight's Cross of Saxony's Military Order of St. Henry and the Knight's Cross of Württemberg's Military Merit Order.

Weddigen died while commanding the submarine . On 18 March 1915 U-29 was rammed by the British battleship HMS Dreadnought in the Pentland Firth. U-29 had broken the surface immediately ahead of Dreadnought after firing a torpedo at HMS Neptune and Dreadnought cut the submarine in two after a short chase. There were no survivors from the submarine.

During the inter-war period, the resurgent Wehrmacht named a newly built barracks in Herford as Otto-Weddigen-Kaserne (renamed Harewood Barracks) in his honour due to the linkage with Weddigen's birthplace. Although the Wehrmacht unit housed inside the barracks was not naval - it was Panzer Abwehr Abteilung 6, an Army anti-tank unit - the occupants of the barracks nevertheless signified the naval connection to Weddigen by placing two large anchors at the base of a large National Socialist Reichsadler at the entrance to the barracks. Ironically, ever since 1945 the barracks has been occupied by British Army soldiers from the Royal Armoured Corps, various other Tank and Cavalry Units and finally Royal Corps of Signals. The barracks was scheduled to close with the withdrawal of British Forces in Germany in 2020.

Bibliography

External links

 

1882 births
1915 deaths
German military personnel killed in World War I
U-boat commanders (Imperial German Navy)
People from the Province of Westphalia
Recipients of the Iron Cross (1914), 1st class
Recipients of the Pour le Mérite (military class)
Knights of the Military Order of Max Joseph
People from Herford
People who died at sea
Imperial German Navy personnel of World War I
Military personnel from North Rhine-Westphalia